The Panda's Thumb: More Reflections in Natural History (1980) is a collection of 31 essays by the Harvard University paleontologist Stephen Jay Gould. It is the second volume culled from his 27-year monthly column "This View of Life" in Natural History magazine.
Recurring themes of the essays are 
evolution and its teaching, science biography, probabilities and common sense.

The title essay (of 1978, originally titled "The panda's peculiar thumb") presents the paradox that poor design is a better argument for evolution than good design, as illustrated by the anatomy of the panda's "thumb"—which is not a thumb at all—but an extension of the radial sesamoid bone. Topics addressed in other essays include the female brain, the Piltdown Man hoax, Down syndrome, and the relationship between dinosaurs and birds.

The Panda's Thumb won the 1981 U.S. National Book Award in Science.

Reviews
Books of the Times - by Christopher Lehmann-Haupt, The New York Times

Notes

References

1980 non-fiction books
American essay collections
Books by Stephen Jay Gould
English-language books
National Book Award-winning works
Science books
Works originally published in Natural History (magazine)
W. W. Norton & Company books